Meyler is a surname. Notable people with the surname include:

Bernadette Meyler, American legal scholar
David Meyler (born 1989), Irish footballer
Fintan Meyler (1929–2005), Irish actress
Hugh Meyler (1875–1929), British politician
John Meyler (born 1956), Irish hurler and Gaelic footballer